The cinnamon-breasted warbler or kopje warbler (Euryptila subcinnamomea) is a species of bird in the family Cisticolidae. It is monotypic within the genus Euryptila. It is found in Namibia and South Africa. Its natural habitat is subtropical or tropical dry shrubland.

References

External links
Cinnamon-breasted warbler - Species text in The Atlas of Southern African Birds.

cinnamon-breasted warbler
Birds of Southern Africa
cinnamon-breasted warbler
Taxonomy articles created by Polbot